8200 may refer to:
 The year 8200 CE.
 Unit 8200, the signal intelligence unit of the Israel Defense Forces.